was a Japanese writer of novels, short stories, poetry and essays, noted for his historical and autobiographical fiction. His most acclaimed works include The Bullfight (Tōgyū, 1949), The Roof Tile of Tempyō (Tenpyō no iraka, 1957) and Tun-huang (Tonkō, 1959).

Biography
Inoue was born into a family of physicians in Asahikawa, Hokkaido in 1907, and later raised in Yugashima, Izu, Shizuoka Prefecture. He was born in Hokkaido but is from Shizuoka Prefecture. In his essay "Hometown Izu", he wrote, "I was born in Asahikawa, Hokkaido, but in the yearbooks and directories, most of my birthplace is Shizuoka Prefecture. When I write it myself, I write it separately from Asahikawa as my place of birth and Shizuoka Prefecture as my birthplace...". In My History of Self-Formation, he wrote, "It seems safe to assume that Izu, where I spent my childhood, was my true hometown, and that everything that would form the basis of my person was created here."

During his high school years, he was an active practitioner of judo. He first studied law and literature at Kyushu University and later changed to philosophy at Kyoto University, where he graduated in 1936 with a degree in aesthetics and a thesis on Paul Valéry. After winning the Chiba Kameo Prize for his early work Ryūten, Inoue started working for the Mainichi Shimbun. In 1937, he was drafted into the Sino-Japanese War, but soon returned due to illness and resumed his occupation at the Mainichi Shimbun. His military service in northern China brought forth his interest in Chinese history.

After the end of the Pacific War, Inoue won critical acclaim with his 1949 novellas The Hunting Gun (Ryōjū) and The Bullfight, the latter earning him the Akutagawa Prize. In the following years, he published several novels and short stories in a variety of genres: contemporary love stories, stories addressing social and political aspects of post-war Japan like Kuroi Ushio, historical novels set in accurately depicted settings like the 1957 The Roof Tile of Tempyō and the 1959 Tun-huang (Tonkō), and works with an autobiographical background like the 1975 Chronicle of My Mother (Waga haha no ki), which documented his mother's deterioration into senility.

Inoue was elected a member of the Japan Art Academy in 1964 and received the Order of Culture in 1976. He died in Tokyo in 1991 at the age of 83.
He had a deep knowledge of shrines, temples, and Japanese history, and served as a supervisor and editorial committee member at several publishing companies.

Selected works
 1937: Ryūten (流転) story
 1949: The Hunting Gun (猟銃, Ryōjū) novella
 1949: The Bullfight (闘牛, Tōgyū) novella
 1950: Kuroi Ushio (黯い潮) novel
 1950: Shi to koi to nami (死と恋と波と) short story collection
 1951: Life of a Counterfeiter (ある偽作家の生涯, Aru gisakka no shōgai) short story collection
 1953: Asunaro monogatari (あすなろ物語) novel
 1956: Hyōheki (氷壁) novel
 1957: The Roof Tile of Tempyō (天平の甍, Tenpyō no iraka) novel
 1958: Kitaguni (北国) poetry collection
 1959: Lou-Lan (楼蘭, Ro-ran) short story collection
 1959: Tun-huang (敦煌, Tonkō) novel
 1960: Yodo dono no nikki (淀どの日記) novel
 1962: Chikūkai (地中海) poetry collection
 1963: Wind and Waves (風濤, Fūtō) novel
 1967: Kaseki (化石) novel
 1967: Unga (運河) poetry collection
 1968: Oroshiyakoku suimutan (おろしや国酔夢譚) novel
 1969: Journey Beyond Samarkand (西域物語, Seiiki monogatari) novel
 1971: Kisetsu (季節) poetry collection
 1975: Chronicle of My Mother (わが母の記, Waga haha no ki) novel
 1976: Enseiro (遠征路) poetry collection
 1979: Zen shishū (全詩集) poetry collection
 1981: Hongakubō ibun (本覺坊遺文) novel
 1989: Confucius (孔子, Kōshi) novel

Awards
 1936: Chiba Kameo Prize for Ryūten
 1950: Akutagawa Prize for The Bullfight
 1957: Ministry of Education, Culture, Sports, Science and Technology Award for The Roof Tile of Tempyo
 1959: Mainichi Press Prize for Tun-huang
 1959: Japan Art Academy Award for Hyōheki
 1961: Noma Literary Prize for Yodo dono no nikki
 1963: Yomiuri Prize for Wind and Waves
 1969: Japanese Literature Grand Prix for Oroshiyakoku suimutan
 1976: Order of Culture
 1980: Kikuchi Kan Prize
 1984: Asahi Prize
 1989: Noma Literary Prize for Confucius

Adaptations (selected)
Films
 1954: Kuroi Ushio, directed by Sō Yamamura
 1955: Asunaro monogatari, directed by Hiromichi Horikawa
 1961: Ryōjū, directed by Heinosuke Gosho
 1972: Kaseki, directed by Masaki Kobayashi
 1989: Sen no Rikyū: Honkakubō ibun, directed by Kei Kumai
 2012: Waga no haha no ki, directed by Masato Harada

Inoue's works have also repeatedly been adapted for television and the stage.

References

External links
 
 

1907 births
1991 deaths
20th-century Japanese novelists
Japanese historical novelists
People from Asahikawa
Kyoto University alumni
Akutagawa Prize winners
Yomiuri Prize winners
20th-century Japanese male writers
Presidents of the Japan Writers’ Association